Jozef-Šimon Turík (born 19 July 1995), is a Slovak professional footballer who plays as a midfielder for 3. liga club MFK Snina.

Club career
Turík was born in Snina in Slovakia. He made his professional Fortuna Liga debut for Zemplín Michalovce against AS Trenčín on 18 July 2015. He played 63 minutes of the game, before being replaced by Vernon De Marco.

Honours
Turík won the 2014–15 DOXXbet liga with the MFK Zemplín Michalovce.

References

External links
 MFK Zemplín Michalovce official profile
 Futbalnet profile
 

1995 births
Living people
Slovak footballers
Association football midfielders
MFK Zemplín Michalovce players
FK Slavoj Trebišov players
FC Košice (2018) players
FK Humenné players
MFK Snina players
Slovak Super Liga players
People from Snina
Sportspeople from the Prešov Region